Liaocheng West railway station is a railway station located in Liaocheng, Shandong, China.

Planned lines 
The station will be the eastern terminus of the planned Liaocheng–Handan–Changzhi high-speed railway.

See also
Liaocheng railway station

References 

Railway stations in Shandong